Yuriy Kocherzhenko (born 9 September 1979) is a Ukrainian former competitive ice dancer. Along with Alla Beknazarova, he is the 2001 Karl Schäfer Memorial bronze medalist and 2001 Ukrainian national champion. Their best ISU Championship result, fourth, came at the 2001 World Junior Championships.

Career 
Kocherzhenko and Tetyana Kurkudym began competing together internationally in 1995. In the 1998–99 season, they medaled at their ISU Junior Grand Prix assignments, taking gold in France and bronze in Germany, and placed fifth at the 1999 World Junior Championships, held in Zagreb in November 1998. In the second half of the season, they competed on the senior level at the 1999 World Championships in Helsinki. They were coached by Yulia Moskalska and then Alexander Tumanovsky.

Kocherzhenko teamed up with Alla Beknazarova in late 1999 or early 2000. They were sent to the 2000 World Junior Championships, held in March in Oberstdorf, and finished 18th. In the 2000–01 season, Beknazarova/Kocherzhenko won gold at two JGP events and qualified for the ISU Junior Grand Prix Final, where they placed fourth. They also finished fourth at the 2001 World Junior Championships in Sofia. They won one senior international medal, bronze at the 2001 Karl Schäfer Memorial, and competed at two senior Grand Prix events and two senior ISU Championships. Their partnership ended in 2003. 

Kocherzhenko moved to the United States and works as a skating coach in Santa Monica, California.

Programs

With Beknazarova

With Kurkudym

Results

With Beknazarova

With Kurkudym

References

External links 
 

Ukrainian male ice dancers
1979 births
Living people
Sportspeople from Odesa
Ukrainian emigrants to the United States
Competitors at the 2003 Winter Universiade